Got Talent Portugal is a talent show adapted for Portugal from the original British show Britain's Got Talent.

The show travels the country in search of people with new and diverse talents: magicians, ventriloquists, singers, orators, dancers, street artists, acrobats, comedians, jugglers, among many others. Without an age limit, it is a unique format in searching for true talent, whether it be an individual or in a group, and gives anonymous people the opportunity to show their artistic gifts in more diverse areas.

Seasons

RTP (2007, 2015 - present)

SIC (2011)

Audiences

References

External links 
 Official site

Portugal
2007 Portuguese television series debuts
Portuguese reality television series
Portuguese music television series
Portuguese television series based on British television series
Rádio e Televisão de Portugal original programming
Sociedade Independente de Comunicação original programming